The 2020 Barcelona FIA Formula 3 round is a motor racing event held on 15 and 16 August 2020 at the Circuit de Barcelona-Catalunya in Montmeló, Catalonia, Spain. It was the sixth round of the 2020 FIA Formula 3 Championship, and ran in support of the 2020 Spanish Grand Prix.

Entries 
After having replaced Enaam Ahmed for the rounds at Silverstone, Ben Barnicoat returned to the British GT Championship with McLaren. The Brit was replaced by one-time F3 race winner Leonardo Pulcini.

Classification

Qualifying 
The Qualifying session took place on 14 August 2020, with Logan Sargeant scoring pole position for the third weekend in a row.

 Notes：

  - Lirim Zendeli was handed a three-place drop, after he was found to have unnecessarily impeded Alex Peroni at the entry to Turn 7.
  - Leonardo Pulcini was given a five-place drop for having gotten in the way of Richard Verschoor at Turn 1.
  - Alessio Deledda was handed a 10-place grid drop for a tyre infringement.

Feature Race

Sprint Race

Standings after the event 

Drivers' Championship standings

Teams' Championship standings

 Note: Only the top five positions are included for both sets of standings.

See also 

 2020 Spanish Grand Prix
 2020 Barcelona Formula 2 round

References

External links 
Official website

|- style="text-align:center"
|width="35%"|Previous race:
|width="30%"|FIA Formula 3 Championship2020 season
|width="40%"|Next race:

Barcelona
2020 in Spanish sport
2020 in Spanish motorsport